Ellen Ravenscroft (1876–1949) was an American painter and printmaker.

Ravenscroft was born in 1876 in Jackson, Michigan. Ravenscroft studied under William Merritt Chase and Robert Henri, and had lessons in Paris with Claudio Castelucho. Among the awards which she received during her career were the portrait prize of the Catherline Lorillard Wolfe Art Club in 1905; the same institution's landscape prize in 1915; and a special prize and honorable mention from the Kansas City Art Institute in 1923. She was a founder member of the New York Society of Women Artists, of which she served as president in 1941. She also founded the Studio Gallery on Fifth Avenue. She was active in St. Louis in the 1920s, but by 1926 had relocated to Provincetown, Massachusetts. She was known for her white-line woodblock technique. Ravenscroft died in 1949 in New York.

References

External links

1876 births
1949 deaths
American women painters
American women printmakers
20th-century American painters
20th-century American printmakers
20th-century American women artists
Students of William Merritt Chase
Students of Robert Henri
Artists from Jackson, Mississippi
Painters from Mississippi